The Taiyuan–Xingxian railway is a railway line in Shanxi, China.

History 
Work on the line began in July 2009. In 2014, reports were published about poor quality earthworks along the line. It opened on 30 December 2014.

On 21 May 2018, passenger services were introduced on the line.

Route 

References

Railway lines in China
Railway lines opened in 2014